Breaking Up is a 1985 TV movie about the breakdown of a marriage seen through the eyes of a child.

Premise
Jackie and Alan break up. Their child struggles to deal with it.

Cast
Nick Enright
Mathew Stevenson
Bradley Kilpatrick
Candy Raymond

Production
The film was based on a 1983 juvenile literature novel by Frank Willmott which was written from the point of view of fifteen year old Mark. The book was a best seller.

Awards
Candy Raymond's performance won her a 1986 AFI Award for Best Actress in a Telefeature.

References

External links

Breaking Up at Screen Australia
Breaking Up at BFI

Australian drama television films
1985 television films
1985 films
Films based on Australian novels
1985 drama films
Films directed by Kathy Mueller
1980s English-language films